Benjamin Walter Jack Spencer (11 December 1981) is a psychiatrist and British Conservative Party politician serving as the Member of Parliament for Runnymede and Weybridge since 2019.

Education
Spencer attended state grammar school in the West Midlands. He has a Masters in mental health law and a PhD on Decision-Making Capacity.

Medical career
Spencer worked for ten years as a doctor at NHS specializing in mental health.

Political career
Spencer sits in the seat of Runnymede and Weybridge.
His voting record is publicly available.

Spencer has been successful in both Private Members Bill Ballots since his election. In 2020, he aimed to put forward the Mental Health Admissions (Data) Bill, however due to COVID and disruption to the Parliamentary schedule, this was unable to proceed through the House.

In 2021, Spencer introduced a second Private Member's Bill presenting his Planning (Enforcement) Bill to Parliament in June 2021. The Bill's second reading took place on 19 November 2021 but was withdrawn with a view to incorporating the provisions in the forthcoming Planning Bill.

He is currently a member of the Work and Pensions Select Committee and the Conservative Party's COVID Recovery Group.

On 3 November 2021, Spencer voted not to suspend Owen Paterson after he had been found guilty of paid lobbying by the Parliamentary Committee on Standards. Spencer later claimed he regretted the decision after Paterson had resigned.

On 23rd September 2022, following the fiscal event introduced by Kwasi Kwarteng, Spencer made a speech in the Commons supporting the measures that had been announced.

On 3 October 2022, Spencer was appointed Parliamentary Private Secretary to the Minister without Portfolio and Chairman of the Conservative Party Jake Berry.

Personal life 
Spencer lives in the constituency with his wife and two children. He has two cats called Frazzle and Ragnar.

References

External links
 

1981 births
Living people
Conservative Party (UK) MPs for English constituencies
English psychiatrists
UK MPs 2019–present